Terance Paul Mathis (born June 7, 1967) is an American former professional football player who was a wide receiver in the National Football League (NFL). Drafted in 1990 by the New York Jets, he played the majority of his career with the Atlanta Falcons, earning second-team All-Pro honors in 1994. He last played in the NFL in 2002 with the Pittsburgh Steelers, then retired after the conclusion of the 2002 season. Currently, he is second in career two-point conversions with six, behind  Marshall Faulk's seven.

On February 1, 2011, Mathis was named as the Offensive Coordinator at Savannah State University.

On May 3, 2017, Mathis was named as the Head Football Coach at Pinecrest Academy in Cumming, Georgia.

Family 
Mathis grew up as the son of Carole Mahone, his father died when he was six months old. His mother is also a breast cancer survivor, having beaten the disease two months before Mathis played in Super Bowl XXXIII. He and his wife Arnedia have a daughter named Terae and a son Terance Jr. Terance also has three other children Sydney, Erik, and Vanessa who just appeared in the Cherish music video "Unappreciated".

High School & College 
Mathis attended Redan High School in Stone Mountain, GA, and University of New Mexico, where he played both football and basketball. In 1989, he became New Mexico's first consensus All-American after setting a Division I record for most receiving yards. He also became the first player to have more than 250 receptions, 4,000 receiving yards, and 6,000 yards total.

NFL 
After Mathis was drafted by the Jets in 1990, he was used as a punt and kick returner. He had 43 kickoff returns for 787 yards, including one touchdown. He also had 19 receptions for 245 yards that season. The following year, he played in all sixteen games for the Jets, starting one. He had 28 receptions for 329 yards and one touchdown. He led the team in kickoff returns, piling up 599 yards. Mathis played with the Jets until 1994, starting two more games and scoring four touchdowns total.

In 1994, Mathis signed as an unrestricted free agent with the Atlanta Falcons. That season, he set a club record by catching 111 passes, becoming the eighth player in the history of the NFL to exceed the 100-catch mark in one season. He also ranked in third in the NFL that season in touchdown receptions. He played on the NFC Pro Bowl squad at the end of the season. He had his second consecutive 1000-yard season the following year despite missing the only two games of his career due to an injury. In 1996, Mathis caught for 771 yards to give him a career total of 3,000 yards.

In 1998, Mathis made his first post-season appearance for the Falcons, and made a three-yard touch down catch for the Falcons in Super Bowl XXXIII. He also led the team in receptions in that game, making seven for eighty-five yards. The following season, he passed Andre Rison as the club's all-time reception leader. Two years later, he passed Rison on the team's all-time touchdown list. After the season, he was released from the Falcons, and signed with the Pittsburgh Steelers. He did not start a game, but had two touchdown receptions and 218 receiving yards. After Pittsburgh chose not to re-sign him, he retired from the NFL.

He is third in Falcons history in touchdown receptions (57), after runner-up Julio Jones (60; 2011–2020), and first place Roddy White (63; 2005–2015); and third in receiving yards (7,349), behind runner-up White (10,863), and first place Jones (12,896).

Charity 
Mathis was selected as the Atlanta Falcons' "Man of the Year" in 1998 for his accomplishments on and off the field. In 1996, he founded the "Terance Loves Children" foundation, now known as the Terance Mathis Foundation.

NASCAR 
In June 2005, Mathis announced the formation of his own NASCAR team, Victory Motorsports, with Carl Long and Morty Buckles as scheduled drivers. Established Cup team Morgan-McClure Motorsports (which received support and engines from Hendrick Motorsports) would provide technical support for the new No. 04 Chevrolet. Mathis and the 34-year-old Buckles ambitiously planned 20 Cup races and a dozen ARCA races for 2006, but the deal never fully materialized. In June 2006, it had been announced Mathis had acquired R&J Racing, but that deal fell through.  In February 2013, he was named Vice President of Marketing for part-time Sprint Cup Series team Leavine Family Racing.

References

External links 
Pittsburghsteelers.com bio
NFL.com stats
Falcon's Mathis using Super Bowl week to make impact.

1967 births
Living people
All-American college football players
American football wide receivers
Atlanta Falcons players
NASCAR team owners
National Conference Pro Bowl players
New Mexico Lobos football players
New York Jets players
Pittsburgh Steelers players
Players of American football from Detroit